Madame la Presidente is a surviving 1916 silent film comedy produced by Oliver Morosco and directed by Frank Lloyd. It was distributed by Paramount Pictures and stars Broadway legend and musical comedy star Anna Held in what would be her final and only feature-length film. The film is based on a play, Madame Presidente, that starred Fannie Ward on Broadway.

Cast
Anna Held - Mademoiselle Goberte
Forrest Stanley - Cyprian Gaudette
Herbert Standing - Augustin Galipaux
Page Peters - Octave Rosimond
Lydia Yeamans Titus - Madame Galipaux
Helen Jerome Eddy - Denise Galipaux
Howard Davies - Marius
Dick La Strange - Lerous (Richard L'Estrange)
Robert Newcomb - De Berton
Frank Bonn - Pinglet (Frank A. Bonn)
Liane Held Carrera - Nightclub Patron

Preservation
A copy of the film is preserved at UCLA Film and Television archive.

See also
Mademoiselle Gobete (1952)
La presidentessa (1977)

References

External links
Madame la Presidente at IMDb.com
 allmovie/synopsis; Madame la Presidente
Forrest Stanley and Anna Held in a scene

1916 films
1916 comedy films
Silent American comedy films
American silent feature films
Films directed by Frank Lloyd
American films based on plays
American black-and-white films
Films set in France
Paramount Pictures films
Surviving American silent films
1910s American films